The Umbro Cup was a friendly international football competition, which took place in June 1995 in England. The trophy was sponsored by the sports brand Umbro, the manufacturers of England's kit.

Host nation England, Sweden, Japan and world champions Brazil participated in the tournament. Brazil were the eventual champions, after winning all three of their games.

The staging of the competition served as an rehearsal for England's hosting of UEFA Euro 1996 the following summer. Matches took place at Wembley, Elland Road, Goodison Park, Villa Park and the City Ground.

Venues

Results
All times listed are British Summer Time (UTC+1)

England vs Japan

Brazil vs Sweden

Japan vs Brazil

England vs Sweden

Sweden vs Japan

England vs Brazil

Final standings

Goalscorers

3 goals
 Kennet Andersson

2 goals
 Edmundo
 Zinho
 Darren Anderton
 David Platt
 Håkan Mild

1 goal
 Juninho Paulista
 Roberto Carlos
 Ronaldo
 Graeme Le Saux
 Teddy Sheringham
 Hisashi Kurosaki
 Masami Ihara
 Toshiya Fujita

External links 
Umbro Cup 1995 at RSSSF
Umbro Cup at Football Database

1995
1994–95 in English football
1995 in Brazilian football
1995 in Japanese football
1995 in Swedish football
June 1995 events in the United Kingdom
International men's association football invitational tournaments